The Loves of Edgar Allan Poe is a 1942 drama film directed by Harry Lachman, starring Linda Darnell and Shepperd Strudwick. The film is a cinematic biography of Edgar Allan Poe that examines his romantic relationships with Sarah Elmira Royster and Virginia Clemm.

Plot
The story focuses on Edgar Allan Poe's romances with, first, Elmira Royster, and, finally, his wife, Virginia Clemm. The story begins in 1811 as Edgar Poe is adopted by John and Frances Allan of Richmond, Virginia after the death of his mother, an actress. Mrs. Frances Allan is devoted to the orphan while Mr. John Allan develops an animosity towards him.

Poe's first love was Elmira Royster, whom he had known since childhood. She married another while Poe was at the University of Virginia, where he amassed gambling debts. In one scene, he is shown meeting with the founder of the university, Thomas Jefferson, although there is no evidence that they ever met.

Poe was never able to forget Elmira. She remained in his thoughts and desires. This passion for her was reflected in his poems. He was disowned by his foster father who opposed his goal to pursue a literary career. Allan disparaged his admiration for Lord Byron. Poe joined the Army and through Allan obtained an appointment to West Point. A military career was not suited for him, so he skipped classes and did not attend functions at the academy, which led to his dismissal.

Poe sought solace in Baltimore with Muddy Clemm and her daughter Virginia Clemm. They took him in and provided him with a home and domestic stability. Poe married Virginia Clemm. After the marriage, Poe did his greatest creative work, becoming the editor and writer for the Southern Literary Messenger and Graham's Magazine.

Poe stirred controversy by advocating for copyright laws that would protect the intellectual property of authors. In this he was supported by Charles Dickens, whom he met in 1842 in Philadelphia when Dickens toured the United States. The mutual admiration both authors had for each other was evident. Dickens tells Poe that he is the greatest writer in America. Poe is subsequently dismissed as editor because of his advocacy of international copyright laws.

Poe, Virginia, and Muddy move to New York City where they live in a cottage in Fordham. Virginia contracts a disease. She is ill. They live in poverty. Poe tells them that he has written his greatest work, "The Raven", which he believes he can sell for $25.

Elmira Royster visits Virginia and offers to provide financial help for her and her husband. Virginia declines the offer of assistance.

Poe offers the poem to Rufus Griswold who turns it down. He has Poe read the poem to his staff of printers. They dislike the poem as well, with the exception of one youth who deems it "wonderful". The film relies on irony because the poem became one of the most famous and successful in American literature.

Poe returns to Virginia and tells her that he has sold the poem. Virginia dies from her illness. Poe is shown reading lines from "Annabelle Lee" for her.

In the final scenes, Poe is dragged through the streets of Baltimore after which he is taken to a hospital. He lingers for three days. He professes his love for Virginia. The film ends with him reading "A Dream Within a Dream" before he dies.

The film presents a sympathetic and positive outline of Poe's life and career.

Critical reception
The film was reviewed in The New York Times where it was judged to be an oversimplified and whitewashed portrayal of the complex and controversial life and career of Edgar Allan Poe.

Cast
 Linda Darnell as Virginia Clemm
 Shepperd Strudwick as Edgar Allan Poe 
 Virginia Gilmore as Elmira Royster
 Jane Darwell as Mrs. Mariah Clemm
 Mary Howard as Frances Allan
 Frank Conroy as John Allan
 Harry Morgan as Ebenezer Burling 
 Walter Kingsford as T.W. White
 Morris Ankrum as Mr. Graham
 Skippy Wanders as Poe, age 3
 Freddie Mercer as Poe, age 12
 Erville Alderson as Burke the Schoolmaster
 Peggy McIntyre as Elmira, age 10
 William Bakewell as Hugh Pleasant 
 Frank Melton as Turner Dixon
 Morton Lowry as Charles Dickens
 Gilbert Emery as Thomas Jefferson
 Edwin Stanley as Dr. Moran 
 Francis Ford as Tavern Keeper
 Harry Denny as Kennedy
 Hardie Albright as Shelton 
 Arthur Shields as Griswald (uncredited)

References

External links 
 
 
 
 

Films set in 1811
American historical drama films
American black-and-white films
Works about Edgar Allan Poe
Cultural depictions of Edgar Allan Poe
Cultural depictions of Thomas Jefferson
Cultural depictions of Charles Dickens
Films based on poems
20th Century Fox films
1940s historical drama films
1940s English-language films
1940s American films